Kulur may refer to:

Kolowr, Iran
Kulur, Indonesia
Kulur, Mangalore, India